Truncation is the term used for limiting the number of digits right of the decimal point by discarding the least significant ones.

Truncation may also refer to:

Mathematics
 Truncation (statistics) refers to measurements which have been cut off at some value
 Truncation (numerical analysis) refers to truncating an infinite sum by a finite one
 Truncation (geometry) is the removal of one or more parts, as for example in truncated cube
 Propositional truncation, a type former which truncates a type down to a mere proposition

Computer science
 Data truncation, an event that occurs when a file or other data is stored in a location too small to accommodate its entire length
 Truncate (SQL), a command in the SQL data manipulation language to quickly remove all data from a table

Biology
 Truncate, a leaf shape
 Truncated protein, a protein shortened by a mutation which specifically induces premature termination of messenger RNA  translation

Other uses
 Cheque truncation, the conversion of physical cheques into electronic form for transmission to the paying bank
 Clipping (morphology), the word formation process which consists in the reduction of a word to one of its parts
 Truncation (archaeology), also 'cut', the removal of archaeological deposits from an archaeological record